The Summer of George, released on July 28, 2009, through Bridge Nine Records, is a teaser EP for the second full-length studio album Chasing Hamburg and third official release from the upstate New York-based post-hardcore/indie rock band Polar Bear Club. It is the follow-up to their debut full-length studio album, Sometimes Things Just Disappear, and received few, but mostly favourable, reviews. The title of the EP is a reference to the 156th episode of the sitcom Seinfeld, "The Summer of George".

Track listing

Release history

Personnel

Polar Bear Club
 Jimmy Stadt - vocals
 Chris Browne - guitar, backing vocals
 Nate Morris - guitar
 Erik Michael "Goose" Henning - bass
 Emmett Menke - drums

Studio personnel
 Matt Bayles - production and engineering

Details
 Studio: Red Room Recording in Seattle, Washington
 Distributor: Caroline Distribution
 Recording type: studio
 Recording mode: stereo
 SPARS code: n/a

References

External links
 Polar Bear Club PureVolume
 Polar Bear Club Last.fm
 Bridge Nine Records Website
 Matt Bayles Website

Polar Bear Club albums
2009 EPs
Bridge 9 Records EPs